The 12247 / 12248 Bandra Terminus–Hazrat Nizamuddin Yuva Express is a Superfast Express train belonging to Indian Railways that run between Bandra Terminus and  in India.

It operates as train number 12247 from Bandra Terminus to Hazrat Nizamuddin and as train number 12248 in the reverse direction, serving the states of Maharashtra, Gujarat, Madhya Pradesh, Rajasthan, Uttar Pradesh & Delhi.

Coach composition
The 12248/12247 Hazrat Nizamuddin - Bandra Terminus Yuva Express has currently 11 AC 3 Tier and 6 AC Economy Chair Car coaches.

As with most train services in India, coach composition may be amended at the discretion of Indian Railways depending on demand.

Service 
12247 Bandra Terminus–Hazrat Nizamuddin Yuva Express covers the distance of 1366 kilometres in 17 hours 05 mins (81.15 km/hr).

12248 Hazrat Nizamuddin–Bandra Terminus Yuva Express covers the distance of 1366 kilometres in 17 hours 45 mins (77.32 km/hr).

As the average speed of the train is more than 55 km/hr, its fare includes a Superfast surcharge.

Route & Halts

The important halts of the train are:

Schedule

Traction
The route is fully electrified. Prior to Western Railway switching to the AC traction, it would be hauled by a WCAM-2/2P engine until  after which it would get either a WAP-7 locomotive from Ghaziabad shed or a WAP-4 from the Vadodara shed.

Since Western Railway switched over to AC traction in February 2012, it is hauled from end to end by a WAP-5 locomotive of Vadodara shed.

Gallery

References 

 http://articles.economictimes.indiatimes.com/2013-01-06/news/36173918_1_yuva-trains-tier-coaches-ac-3
 http://www.indianexpress.com/news/yuva-express-on-track-cheaper-travel-for-students-jobless-youth/566776/
 http://www.indianexpress.com/news/uncomfortable-chair-cars-keep-youth-away-from-yuva-trains/948376/
 http://wr.indianrailways.gov.in/view_detail.jsp?lang=0&id=0,4,268&dcd=1714&did=13872828774443E9957A4C0A99BC4A93487CEE8EFB03A.web103

Sister trains
 August Kranti Rajdhani Express
 Bandra Terminus–Hazrat Nizamuddin AC Superfast Express
 Bandra Terminus–Hazrat Nizamuddin Garib Rath Express
 Delhi Sarai Rohilla Bandra Terminus Garib Rath Express
 Lokmanya Tilak Terminus–Hazrat Nizamuddin AC Express
 Maharashtra Sampark Kranti Express
 Mumbai–New Delhi Duronto Express
 Mumbai Rajdhani Express
 Mumbai CSMT–Hazrat Nizamuddin Rajdhani Express

Delhi–Mumbai trains
Yuva Express trains
Rail transport in Uttar Pradesh
Rail transport in Madhya Pradesh
Rail transport in Gujarat
Rail transport in Rajasthan
Railway services introduced in 2010